93 (ninety-three) is the natural number following 92 and preceding 94.

In mathematics
93 is:

 the twenty-eighth distinct semiprime and the ninth of the form (3.q).
 the first number in the third triplet of consecutive semiprimes, 93, 94, and 95.
 a Blum integer, since its two prime factors, 3 and 31 are both Gaussian primes.
 a repdigit in base 5 (3335), and 30 (3330).
 palindromic in bases 2, 5, and 30.
 a lucky number.
 a cake number.
 an idoneal number.

There are 93 different cyclic Gilbreath permutations on 11 elements, and therefore there are 93 different real periodic points of order 11 on the Mandelbrot set.

In other fields
Ninety-three is:
The atomic number of neptunium, an actinide.
 The code for international direct dial phone calls to Afghanistan.
 One of two ISBN Group Identifiers for books published in India.
 The number of the French department Seine-Saint-Denis, and as such used by many French gangsta rappers and those emulating their speech.

In classical Persian finger counting, the number 93 is represented by a closed fist. Because of this, classical Arab and Persian poets around 1 CE referred to someone's lack of generosity by saying that the person's hand made "ninety-three".

See also
 AD 93, a year in the Julian calendar
List of highways numbered 93 
Ninety-Three (Quatrevingt-treize), a novel concerning the French Revolution by Victor Hugo
93 (Thelema), a greeting among Thelemites based on the numerological (gematric) value of Thelema (Will) and Agape (Love) in Greek letters.
 Babia 93, an album from a Pakistani pop singer Sajjad Ali
 London's 93 Feet East music venue
 Current 93, a musical project of David Tibet
 Los Angeles 93 KHJ radio
 United Airlines Flight 93, one of the airplanes hijacked on September 11, 2001.
 93 'til Infinity, the debut album by Oakland hip hop group Souls of Mischief.

References

External links

 On the Number 93

Integers